Hugh Bolton may refer to:

 Hugh Bolton (ice hockey) (1929–1999), Canadian ice hockey defenceman
 Hugh Bolton (trade unionist) (died 1947), British trade union official
 Hugh Bolton (priest) (1683–1758), Anglican priest in Ireland
 Hugh Bolton (footballer) (1879–?), Scottish footballer